Barbacoa is a form of cooking meat that originated in the Caribbean with the Taíno people, who called it by the Arawak word barbaca, from which the term "barbacoa" derives, and ultimately, the word 'barbecue". In contemporary Mexico, it generally refers to meats or whole sheep or whole goats slow-cooked over an open fire or, more traditionally, in a hole dug in the ground covered with agave (maguey) leaves, although the interpretation is loose, and in the present day (and in some cases) may refer to meat steamed until tender. This meat is known for its high fat content and strong flavor, often accompanied with onions and cilantro (coriander leaf).

Adaptations

In the U.S., barbacoa is often prepared with parts from the heads of cattle, such as the cheeks. In northern Mexico, it is also sometimes made from beef head, but more often it is prepared from goat meat (cabrito). In central Mexico, the meat of choice is lamb, and in the Yucatan, their traditional version, cochinita pibil (pit-style pork), is prepared with pork.

Barbacoa was later adopted into the cuisine of the southwestern United States by way of Texas. The word transformed in time to "barbecue".

In the Philippines, the Visayan dish balbacua (also spelled balbakwa) is named after barbacoa, probably for the similar length of cooking time and tenderness of the meat. It is a completely different dish. Unlike Latin American versions, it is a stew made from beef, oxtail, cow feet and skin boiled for several hours until gelatinous and extremely tender.

Etymology

The word barbacoa is believed to have come from the mainland Taino (eastern Dominican Republic), as in this source:

But when we take the term 'barbacoa', which originates from Arawak (specifically, the Taíno language), it is known thanks to the writings of Gonzalo Fernández de Oviedo in his Natural and General History of the Indians, who described two of its meanings: «unos palos que ponen, a manera de parrilla o trébedes, en hueco», para asar los peces y animales que cazaban. Tal aseveración compite con la tesis de que, al designar un tipo de parrillada, esa palabra es una castellanización de la palabra inglesa-norteamericana barbecue, que a su vez nace de la expresión francesa de la barbe á la queue («de la barba  o mentón  a la cola», que era como los tramperos canadienses francófonos ensartaban con una barra de hierro las reses que cazaban para asarlas.

Notable restaurants 
Brownsville Texas's Vera's Backyard Bar-B-Que as of 2022 is the only restaurant in Texas still serving barbacoa made using the traditional method commercially because they are grandfathered in; all other legal commercial providers steam the meat rather than pit-smoking it.

See also

 Carne asada
 Mandi (food)
 List of meat dishes
 List of Mexican dishes

References

Barbecue
Meat dishes
Caribbean cuisine
Mexican cuisine
Texan cuisine